Morehead is an unincorporated community in Neosho County, Kansas, United States.

History
Morehead had a post office from the 1870s until 1954. It also had a school house, and a depot on the Leavenworth, Lawrence and Galveston Railroad.

References

Further reading

External links
 Neosho County maps: Current, Historic, KDOT

Unincorporated communities in Neosho County, Kansas
Unincorporated communities in Kansas